The Dürnrohr power station is a thermal power station in Lower Austria.

The power station was built as a replacement for the Zwentendorf Nuclear Power Station, a plant that was finished but due to a 1978 referendum never started up. The Dürnrohr plant was built in its proximity in order to use the already established power lines and other infrastructure. It consists of two blocks: the first with output of 405 MW operated by VERBUND Austrian Thermal Power AG and the second with output 352 MW operated by the Energie-Versorgung Niederösterreich AG. The plant was finished in 1987.

The plant was powered by black coal imported from the Czech Republic and Poland but today it burns any type of coal and can also use natural gas. In 2004 a heating plant (largest such in Austria, at the time) using the dissipated waste heat was opened.

In 2009 the district heating pipeline from the power station to Sankt Pölten was erected from EVN Wärme. It is the longest district heating pipeline in Austria, with a length of 31 km.

The power station is one of the biggest emitters of CO2 in Austria.

References 

Coal-fired power stations in Austria
Natural gas-fired power stations in Austria
Economy of Lower Austria